United States gubernatorial elections were held in 1959, in four states. Kentucky, Louisiana and Mississippi hold their gubernatorial elections in odd numbered years, every 4 years, preceding the United States presidential election year. Hawaii held its first gubernatorial election on achieving statehood.

Results

References

 
November 1959 events in the United States
1950s